The 1958 Lady Wigram Trophy was a motor race held at the Wigram Airfield Circuit on 25 January 1958. It was the seventh Lady Wigram Trophy to be held and was won by Archie Scott Brown in the Lister 57/1. This would prove to be one of Scott Brown's last victories before his untimely death at Spa-Francorchamps later that year.

Classification

References

Lady Wigram Trophy
Lady
January 1958 sports events in New Zealand